Galion is a city in Crawford, Morrow, and Richland counties in the U.S. state of Ohio. The population was 10,453 at the 2020 census. Galion is the second-largest city in Crawford County after Bucyrus.

The Crawford County portion of Galion is part of the Bucyrus Micropolitan Statistical Area. The small portion of the city that is located in Richland County is part of the Mansfield Metropolitan Statistical Area, while the portion extending into Morrow County is considered part of the Columbus Metropolitan Statistical Area.

History
The region was first inhabited by Native American tribes up until the first settlers, Benjamin Leveridge and his two sons, arrived in 1817. In 1820, William Hosford and his two sons, Asa and Horace, settled on land outside of the area. It was not until Colonel James Kilbourne decided to "lay out a town half way between Columbus and the Lakes" that the crossroads of Portland and Main street were settled by the Hosford family. This crossing was known by various names including: Moccasin, Horseshoe, Hard Scrabble, Spang Town, Hosfords and Goshen. Galion was laid out in 1831. However, in 1824 the town petitioned for a post office using the name Goshen and later changed to Galion by the postmaster general, John McLean, due to a town already being named Goshen in Ohio. The etymology of the name Galion is uncertain.  A post office called Galion has been in operation since 1825.

Asa Hosford is considered the "Father of Galion" due to his work as a state legislator in which he did work to get a rail line through the area that was completed in 1851.

On Sunday, April 30, 1882, a mob of around 2,000 people took Frank Fisher, an African American accused of raping a white woman, from Galion's jail and hanged him.

Ohio Central Traction Company, an interurban line that connected the two communities of Bucyrus and Galion, developed Seccaium Park at the end of the Nineteenth Century.

Galion is home of The Galion Graders a member of the Great Lakes Summer Collegiate Baseball League. The GLSCBL is a wooden bat league for college athletes looking to further improve on their great skill. The Graders specifically focus on doing this while providing a fun, family oriented experience for its fans and their communities.

Geography
Galion is located in the southeastern corner of Crawford County at  (40.733164, -82.788586).

Galion lies just south of a continental divide.  The Olentangy River begins near and runs through Galion, and then winds southward toward Columbus and eventually empties into the Scioto River, a tributary of the Ohio and thus of the Mississippi.  However, Lake Galion, which lies just north of town, is part of the Sandusky River watershed, which drains via Lakes Erie and Ontario into the Saint Lawrence River.

Demographics

2020 Census
The 2020 United States Census reported Galion's population as being 10,453, a slight decrease in the city's population in 2010.

2010 Census
As of the census of 2010, there were 10,512 people, 4,484 households, and 2,797 families living in the city. The racial makeup of the city was 97.6% White, 0.5% African American, 0.1% Native American, 0.2% Asian, 0.4% from other races, and 1.1% from two or more races. Hispanic or Latino of any race were 1.3% of the population.

There were 4,484 households, of which 30.8% had children under the age of 18 living with them, 43.7% were married couples living together, 14.2% had a female householder with no husband present, 4.5% had a male householder with no wife present, and 37.6% were non-families. 32.0% of all households were made up of individuals, and 13.8% had someone living alone who was 65 years of age or older. The average household size was 2.32 and the average family size as 2.89.

The median age in the city was 39.7 years. 24.3% of residents were under the age of 18; 8.2% were between the ages of 18 and 24; 24.6% were from 25 to 44; 25.7% were from 45 to 64; and 17.3% were 65 years of age or older. The gender makeup of the city was 47.1% male and 52.9% female.

2000 Census
As of the census of 2000, there were 11,341 people, 4,791 households, and 3,090 families living in the city. The population density was 2,286.5 people per square mile (882.8/km2). There were 5,150 housing units at an average density of 1,038.3 per square mile (400.9/km2). The racial makeup of the city was 98.28% White, 0.22% African American, 0.31% Native American, 0.26% Asian, 0.01% Pacific Islander, 0.35% from other races, and 0.56% from two or more races. Hispanic or Latino of any race were 0.93% of the population.

There were 4,791 households, out of which 31.0% had children under the age of 18 living with them, 48.3% were married couples living together, 12.2% had a female householder with no husband present, and 35.5% were non-families. 30.7% of all households were made up of individuals, and 13.6% had someone living alone who was 65 years of age or older. The average household size was 2.34 and the average family size was 2.90.

In the city the population was spread out, with 25.5% under the age of 18, 8.5% from 18 to 24, 27.8% from 25 to 44, 22.2% from 45 to 64, and 16.0% who were 65 years of age or older. The median age was 37 years. For every 100 females, there were 85.6 males. For every 100 females age 18 and over, there were 82.7 males.

The median income for a household in the city was $31,513, and the median income for a family was $38,554. Males had a median income of $32,517 versus $19,792 for females. The per capita income for the city was $16,113. About 11.9% of families and 14.7% of the population were below the poverty line, including 19.6% of those under age 18 and 11.3% of those age 65 or over.

Government
Galion has a Mayor-Council government: it is governed by an elected city council and mayor. Thomas O’Leary has served as mayor since 2013.

Education

Galion City School District 

The Galion City School District encompasses the entire city of Galion, graduating about 150 students annually. There are a handful of neighborhoods outside of Galion that are also included in the school district, including Blooming Grove. Galion High School serves students ranging from grades 9 through 12. The school colors are blue and orange and its athletic teams are known as the Tigers. The current high school building opened in 2007 following the demolition of the previous home of Galion High School on North Union Street.

The first Galion Union High School was built in 1868 on West Walnut Street and served as Galion High School until 1917. This building was demolished in 1924 and a new junior high school was built on the site in 1925, which was razed in April 2008. The second home of GHS was built in 1917 on the site of a former cemetery on North Union Street. This building was extended in 1962, adding features such as a large gymnasium. This building was in use until the end of the 2006–2007 school year, with the new Galion High School opening in late 2007.

Galion Public Library 

The Galion Public Library was formally dedicated on April 28, 1904. The "purely 20th century synthesis of Greek and Roman designs" was designed by Vernon Redding a prominent architect from Mansfield, Ohio that designed the Mansfield Public Library using the Galion design as a foundation. However, the organization and establishment of the current library were made from the efforts of a woman's organization called The Current News Club. The organization pushed for the establishment of a public library and started a library fund that had been started using funds from other organizations and contributions from citizens of Galion. In 1898, a state law was passed providing for a mandatory establishment of a library through the Boards of Education in Galion due to its size. The Current News Club incorporated the Galion Public Library Association on March 26, 1901 with "the purpose of building and opening a public library free to all the citizens of the Galion Public School district." The association purchased the land in which the building currently resides on North Market street for $2,850 in which "the lot already had an old log residence on it, one of the oldest buildings in the city, and was one of the early school houses half a century previously." This log building, now located in Heise Park, provided for a comfortable "reading room" and "became the pride and glory of the infant library association" but quickly became too small for to serve the citizens of Galion. In February 1902 the association sent representatives to meet with Andrew Carnegie to seek financial assistance in building a new library and was approved for $15,000 with a "guarantee of an annual support for the library of not less than ten percent of that amount" which was later approved by the city council with a resolution that passed on April 18, 1902.

Media
Galion and neighboring communities are served by a semi-weekly newspaper, the Galion Inquirer. The city's first newspaper, The District Democrat, was founded in 1855 and later sold and renamed The Galion Train.

Parks and recreation

Festivals
Every year the City of Galion hosts two major festivals: The Oktoberfest and the Pickle Run Festival.

Pickle Run Festival

The Pickle Run Festival began in 1961 and was said to have been inspired "when a grocer used to dump his old pickles into the Whetstone Creek behind his store and the pickles would run through the creek." The festival would include events like the Pickle Run 5k, car show, watermelon diving competition along with carnival rides and food vendors among other things. The Pickle Run did not run from 1998 up till 2015 when volunteers started the Pickle Run festival over moving the original date on Labor Day to the Fourth of July weekend.

Oktoberfest 
Started by the Galion Jaycees in 1976 and later ran by the local Moose Lodge, the Galion Oktoberfest is the city's fall festival that runs on the last weekend of September in the city's Uptowne Business District. This three day event features a carnival with rides and vendors as well as live music.

Edgar M. Freese Foundation 
Long time resident of Galion and Industrialist Horace E. Freese established a trust fund now known as the Edgar M. Freese Foundation and established Galion, Ohio as the benefactor of the foundation. The will established that all income from the fund "may be used for he upkeep or improvement of city parks/facilities, college scholarships to worthy Galion High School graduates, or any other purposes suitable to the memory of Egbert M. Freese."

The Freese Foundation board member consist of the mayor, safety-service director, and city counsel president as well as two appointed citizens. The Freese Grants are reviewed every spring and are available by application to "the city of Galion, Galion City Schools, and any local 501(c)3 nonprofit organization." However, there must be a 25%  match by the grantee toward the project that is funded.

Edgar M. Freese Foundation Completed Projects

Transportation

The Erie Railroad also ran through Galion and established large rail yards here, making the city an important rail center. In April, 1851 the Cleveland Columbus and Cincinnati Railroad, later known as the "Big Four" and eventually the New York Central, began operating regular service between Columbus and Cleveland, stopping at Galion along the way.  Prior to the end of the 19th century, Galion became a division headquarters for the line.

Galion once boasted two large railroad depots. The Big Four Depot at 127 Washington Street served passenger trains until 1971.  The Erie Depot on South Market Street, served until 1970 and the 1891 structure was demolished later that year.  With the move of the Erie yards to Marion in the 1910s, the railroads declined, although the city remained a passenger rail center into the 1960s.  The Big Four Depot was abandoned; however, it has since been acquired by the City of Galion and is undergoing a slow but thorough restoration.

From 1915 to 1923, Galion was on the original route of the Lincoln Highway, America's first coast-to-coast route.  In later years, however, the northern route was improved and became US 30 North, although until approximately 1970 the route through Galion was designated as US 30 South.  The new, four-lane US 30 opened in 2005, and passes just north of town, giving the community excellent transportation access.

State routes in Galion include 309, which connects Marion to the southwest with Ontario to the east; 598, which originates in Galion and stretches northward; 19, which heads westward toward the county seat and also south toward Williamsport; 61, which goes south towards Morrow and Delaware Counties and north to Lake Erie, and 97, which goes east through Lexington.

Historic landmarks

Adam Howard House 

Home of the founder of the Galion Buggy Company, the house was listed on the National Register of Historic Places on March 30, 1978 and is located on South Boston Street. The  home was built in 1898 and was later owned by the Galion Historical Society and sat vacant for 50 years until its auction to Tim and Connie Musselman in 2015. The Victorian-era house designed by Vernon Redding features "massive pillars on the front porch, a golden oak vestibule and carved stairs leading to a circular balustrade and ballroom, all illuminated by a stained-glass skylight."

Brownella Cottage and Grace Episcopal Church and Rectory 
Brownella Cottage and Grace Episcopal Church and Rectory  is a historic church complex at S. Union and Walnut Streets.

The site is significant for its association with Bishop William Montgomery Brown, notable as the first bishop of his communion to be tried for heresy since the Reformation and "'the first of any creed in America to be deposed for heretical teaching'".

The complex includes:
 the Brownella Cottage, built during 1885-1887 for Brown and his wife, Ella Scranton Bradford, which was the bishop's home until his death in 1937
 the bishop's study, formerly St. Joseph's Roman Catholic Church
 the Brownella carriage house
 Grace Episcopal Church
 the rectory of the Grace Episcopal Church

Central Hotel, Hackedorn and Zimmerman Building 

The Central Hotel is a combination of three buildings that are "all that remains of Galion's significant commercial boom in the 1860's." The Central Hotel was registered on the National Historic Registry on Nav.13, 1976 but did not see any significant improvements until it was procured by the Ohio Capital Corporation for Housing in 2004. The non-profit led a significant restructuring and investment into the building and the building is now an affordable housing for seniors.

Hosford House 
The Hosford House was built in 1892 by Asa Hosford and listed on the National Historic Registry on April 30, 1976. Asa Hosford is considered the "Father of Galion" due to his work as a state legislator in which he did work to get a rail line through the area that was completed in 1851.

Industry

The Galion brand of heavy equipment, such as road graders, road rollers, and earthmovers, was manufactured by Galion Iron Works, later purchased by Dresser Industries and then by Komatsu.

Galion was once the home of Peabody Galion, a manufacturer of sanitation equipment, primarily dump bodies, as well as front loading, side-loading and rear loading garbage trucks; rivaling the Heil Company for numbers of units sold throughout the world. For a short time, in the early 1970s, Peabody Galion maintained a manufacturing plant in Durant, Oklahoma, known as "Peabody Galion, Durant Division".

Galion was also once home to North Electric Company, a prime supplier of telephone switching systems for government and international markets. It was also producer of the Ericofon, the first ever one-piece telephone designed by Ralph Lysell and Hugo Blomberg. Founded in 1884 by Charles N. North, the company became part of Ericsson in 1951. It was purchased by ITT in the mid-1970s and operated as ITT PowerSystems until the late 1980s, when it was sold to a private consortium and renamed PECO II (the name is derived from North Electric Company's purchase of Power Equipment Company (PECO) in 1960). Peco II purchased the telecommunications product line and associated assets from ITT in 1988. In 2010, PECO II was acquired by Lineage Power of Plano, Texas and has since closed the plant.

Notable residents 
 Logan Bartholomew (born February 9, 1984) actor born in Galion, best known for his role of Willie LaHaye in the Love Comes Softly series
 Julius H. Block, Minnesota State Treasurer, was born in Galion
 William Montgomery Brown, Episcopal clergyman and author, lived in Galion
 Florence Kling Harding, First Lady of the United States, lived in Galion with her first husband, Henry ("Pete") DeWolfe
 Henry David Lee, founder of the HD Lee Mercantile Company, inventors of Lee Jeans, lived in and operated a business in Galion
 Robert W. Morgan, radio personality, was from Galion
 Orville Nave, theologian and chaplain, was born in Galion
 Nate Reinking, professional basketball player for the British Basketball League and the Great Britain men's national basketball team; head coach in the NBA G League
 Bob Schnelker, professional football player in the National Football League
 JB Shuck, professional baseball player in Major League Baseball, raised in Galion and attended Galion High School

References

External links
 Galion Historical Society
City website

 
Cities in Ohio
Cities in Crawford County, Ohio
Cities in Morrow County, Ohio
Cities in Richland County, Ohio
1831 establishments in Ohio
Populated places established in 1831